Phlegmacium caesiocolor is a species of fungus in the family Cortinariaceae.

Taxonomy 
It was originally described in 2014 by the mycologists Ilkka Kytövuori, Kare Liimatainen and Tuula Niskanen who classified it as Cortinarius caesiocolor. It was placed in the (subgenus Phlegmacium) of the large mushroom genus Cortinarius.

In 2022 the species was transferred from Cortinarius and reclassified as Phlegmacium boreidionysae based on genomic data.

Habitat and distribution 
Found in southern Finland, where it grows with oak, poplar, and hazel in deciduous forests, roadsides, and parks, it was described as new to science in 2014. The specific epithet refers to the bluish-violet color of the cap. C. chromataphilus is a sister species.

See also
List of Cortinarius species

References

External links

caesiocolor
Fungi described in 2014
Fungi of Finland